Conrad Hinrich Donner (11 April 1774, in Altona – 1 January 1854) was a German banker
and art collector.

Life 
Conrad Hinrich Donner was the son of Johann Christian Donner (1739-1804), a buyer and the Danish consul in Hamburg and Maria Anterrer (1742-1802) from Altona. Donner was at first the owner of a tobacco factory with 150 workers. In 1798 he established the Company Conrad Hinrich Donner for the sale of goods and the provision of marine insurance (Assekuranz).  Company Conrad Hinrich Donner was also a shipping company from which sailing boats operated. Later the banking transactions stepped ever more into the foreground, with the formation of Conrad Hinrich Donner Bank. He had close business ties to the shipping magnate Johann Cesar VI. Godeffroy. In 1820 Donner bought Sieveking Garden (today Donners Park :de:Donners Park) and there in 1843 he established an art museum containing sculptures of Bertel Thorvaldsen and Herman Wilhelm Bissen). The museum and an orangery was designed by of Gottfried Semper. Conrad Hinrich Donner donated large sums for charitable purposes and was a promoter of art and science. Through his father, Donner was a personal friend of King Christian VIII of Denmark who stayed with him at Altona.

Notes

References
 Deutsches Geschlechterbuch, Hamburg-Band 9, Seite 220, Band 127 der Gesamtreihe, C. A. Starke Verlag, Limburg (Lahn) 1961

External links
The Donners Park estate, Altona

Businesspeople from Hamburg
1774 births
1854 deaths
German bankers
German art collectors
19th-century art collectors